The A6 Ladies Open was a women's professional golf tournament on the Swedish Golf Tour, played between 2011 and 2013. It was always held at A6 Golf Club in Jönköping, Sweden.

The tournament was introduced in 2011, in the second season of the Nordea Tour era. Danish amateur Nanna Koerstz Madsen won the final installment in 2013.

Winners

References

Swedish Golf Tour (women) events